Nedrema is a village in Lääneranna Parish, Pärnu County in southwestern Estonia.

See also
Nedrema Nature Reserve

References

 

Villages in Pärnu County